The First Lady Stakes is a Grade I American thoroughbred horse race for fillies & mares, age three and older over a distance of one mile on the turf held annually in October at Keeneland Race Course in Lexington, Kentucky during the fall meeting.

History

The race was first run on October 16 1998 as the First Lady Stakes at a distance of  miles and was sponsored by Vinery Farm located in Lexington.  

In 2000, WinStar Farm became the race's sponsor from then through 2005 and it was renamed the Galaxy Stakes. 
Also that year the event was classified Grade III by the American Graded Stakes Committee who upgraded it as a Grade II race the following year.

In 2005 the distance of the event was decreased to its present distance of one mile.

In 2006, the name of the event was reverted to its inaugural title.

The First Lady Stakes is a steppingstone to the Breeders' Cup Filly & Mare Turf. In 2000, Perfect Sting ran second in this race but went on to win that year's inaugural edition of the Breeders' Cup Filly & Mare Turf. In 2005, Intercontinental won this race and the ensuing Breeders' Cup and was crowned US Champion Female Turf Horse. The 2008 winner Forever Together also went on to win the Breeders' Cup Filly & Mare Turf and was crowned US Champion Female Turf Horse. The 2015 winner Tepin went on to defeat the males in the Breeders' Cup Mile and also was crowned US Champion Female Turf Horse. The British bred Uni was the most recent winner to claim the Breeders' Cup Mile after winning this event in 2019.

Records
Speed  record: 
 1:33.22  - Uni (GB) (2019)

Margins: 
 lengths – Bien Nicole  (2003)

Most wins
 2 -  Uni (GB) (2019, 2020)

Most wins by an owner
 3 - Michael Dubb & Bethlehem Stables (in partnership) (2018, 2019, 2020)

Most wins by a jockey
 5 - Julien Leparoux (2006, 2008, 2011, 2013, 2015)

Most wins by a trainer
 6 - Chad C. Brown (2014, 2018, 2019, 2020, 2021, 2022)

Winners

Legend:

See also 
 List of American and Canadian Graded races

References

Graded stakes races in the United States
Grade 1 stakes races in the United States
Grade 1 turf stakes races in the United States
Mile category horse races for fillies and mares
Recurring sporting events established in 1998
Keeneland horse races
1998 establishments in Kentucky
Breeders' Cup Challenge series